The Crystal Kite Award  (also known as 'Crystal Kite Members Choice Award) is given by the Society of Children's Book Writers and Illustrators (SCBWI) each year to recognize great books from the 70 SCBWI regions around the world. Along with the SCBWI Golden Kite Awards, the Crystal Kite Awards are chosen by other children's book writers and illustrators, making them the only peer-given awards in publishing for young readers.

Each SCBWI member votes for their favorite book from a nominated author in their region that was published in the previous calendar year.

Winners

International Regions

Australia / New Zealand

Canada

Europe / Latin America / Africa

Middle East / India / Asia

UK / Ireland

Regions in the United States

Atlantic (Pennsylvania / Delaware / New Jersey / Wash DC / Virginia / West Virginia / Maryland)

California / Hawaii

Mid-South (Kansas / Louisiana / Arkansas / Tennessee / Kentucky / Missouri)

Mid-West (Minnesota / Iowa / Nebraska / Wisconsin / Illinois / Michigan / Indiana / Ohio)

New England (Maine / Vermont / New Hampshire / Connecticut / Massachusetts / Rhode Island)

New York

South-East (Florida / Georgia / South Carolina / North Carolina / Alabama / Mississippi)

South-West (Nevada / Arizona / Utah / Colorado / Wyoming / New Mexico)

Texas / Oklahoma

West (Washington / Oregon / Alaska / Idaho / Montana / North Dakota / South Dakota)

References

SCBWI Website 
List of Winners 
2013 List of Winners 
Announcement of 2011 Awards 
School Library Journal 

American children's literary awards